Events in the year 1985 in Norway.

Incumbents
 Monarch – Olav V
 Prime Minister – Kåre Willoch (Conservative Party)

Events

 25 February – The trial of the accused spy Arne Treholt starts.
 20 June – Arne Treholt was sentenced to 20 years in prison for espionage.
 9 September – The 1985 Parliamentary election takes place.
 3 December – The Rock carvings at Alta, Norway's only prehistoric World Heritage Site, is designated by UNESCO as a World Heritage Site.
 The volcano Beerenberg on the Norwegian volcanic island Jan Mayen erupts.

Popular culture

Sports

Music 

 4 May – With the song "La det swinge" ("Let it swing"), Norway's Norwegian pop duo Bobbysocks! wins Eurovision Song Contest 1985.
 16 September – Norwegian Pop band A-ha releases a new version of their single Take On Me, which debuted last year, featuring a cartoon music video of a motor race; within weeks it is a number one hit worldwide in countries including the United Kingdom and the United States of America.

Film

Literature
Fredrik Skagen, writer, is awarded the Norwegian Booksellers' Prize.
Harald Sverdrup, poet and children's writer, is awarded the Riksmål Society Literature Prize.

Television

Notable births

2 January – André Roligheten, jazz musician and composer
4 January – Kari Aalvik Grimsbø, handball player.
10 January – Gabrielle Leithaug, electropop singer
10 January – Guro Knutsen Mienna, footballer
10 January – Anette Sagen, ski jumper
13 January – Leif Otto Paulsen, footballer
13 January – Kari Vikhagen Gjeitnes, cross-country skier
20 January – André Danielsen, footballer
29 January – Jon Rune Strøm, jazz musician
1 February – Mounir Hamoud, footballer
2 February – Kristian Skogsrud, footballer
15 February – Gøril Snorroeggen, handball player
17 February – Anders Jacobsen, ski jumper
19 February – Kristoffer Lo, jazz musician
22 February – Iven Austbø, football goalkeeper
25 February – Thomas Borge Lie, freestyle skier
28 February – Åsmund Grøver Aukrust, politician
1 March – Mari Fasting, orienteering competitor and ski mountaineer
2 March – Torstein Tvedt Solberg, politician
3 March – Maren Haugli, speed skater
6 March – Olav Dalen, footballer
10 March – Mikko Kokslien, Nordic combined skier
19 March – Christine Guldbrandsen, singer
21 March – Margrethe Renstrøm, long jumper
22 March – Jonas Johansen, footballer
2 April – Lars Erik Spets, ice hockey player
3 April – June Pedersen, footballer
12 April – Siri Nilsen, singer-songwriter
16 April – Ingeborg Gjærum, environmentalist
7 May – Tonje Nøstvold, handball player.
7 May – Espen Næss Lund, footballer
12 May – Elise Egseth, orienteering competitor
14 May – Tore Sandbakken, jazz musician
15 May – Knut Gravråk, politician
19 May – Arve Walde, footballer
21 May – Alexander Dale Oen, swimmer (died 2012)
25 May – Børre Steenslid, footballer
29 May – Benjamin Hermansen, murder victim (died 2001)
1 June – Johnny Lodden, poker player
1 June – Kjell Ingolf Ropstad, politician
2 June – Bjørnar Holmvik, footballer
3 June – Mohammad Usman Rana, columnist
3 June – Steffen Thoresen, ice hockey player
4 June – Oddvar Reiakvam, politician
13 June – Ida Alstad, handball player.
13 June – Elisabeth Carew, singer and songwriter
17 June – Espen Christensen, handball player
20 June – Ellen Brekken, jazz musician
28 June – Inga Berit Svestad, handball player.
2 July – Gunnhild Sundli, singer and actor
12 July – Emil Hegle Svendsen, biathlete
17 July – Henning Hauger, footballer
17 July – Knut Olav Rindarøy, footballer
23 July – Kristian Ruth, sailor
25 July – Anneli Giske, footballer
30 July – Daniel Fredheim Holm, footballer
1 August – Caroline Dina Kongerud, musician
10 August – Ørjan Johannessen, chef
11 August – Hildegunn Gjertrud Hovdenak, cyclist
12 August – Kirby Ann Basken, model
14 August – Tove Lill Løyte, glamour model and politician
15 August – Carina Dahl, pop singer and songwriter
22 August – Kim Johannesen, jazz musician
25 August – Kenneth Sola, footballer
28 August – Kjetil Jansrud, alpine skier.
13 September – Fredrik Nordkvelle, footballer
15 September – Iselin Steiro, model
16 September – Johan Remen Evensen, ski jumper
2 October – Ole Marius Ingvaldsen, ski jumper
5 October – Per Martin Sandtrøen, politician.
11 October – Margaret Berger, electropop singer and songwriter
11 October – Øyvind Gram, footballer
15 October – Øystein Skar, pianist and composer
22 October – Rohit David, darts player
23 October – Mohammed Abdellaoue, footballer
7 November – Kent Ove Clausen, cross-country skier
18 November – Alexander Gabrielsen, footballer
25 November – Marit Malm Frafjord, handball player.
1 December – Petter Eliassen, cross country skier
4 December – Linni Meister, glamour model
19 December – Ine Hoem, jazz singer
30 December – Marie Sneve Martinussen, politician.

Notable deaths

10 January – André Bjerke, writer and poet (born 1918)
16 January – Arnt Njargel, politician (born 1901)
19 January – Svein Rosseland, astrophysicist (born 1894)
6 February – Inger Hagerup, author, playwright and poet (born 1905)
6 February – Harald Johan Løbak, politician and Minister (born 1904)
4 March – Odd Rasdal, long-distance runner (born 1911)
4 March – Sverre Strandli, hammer thrower and European Champion (born 1925)
12 March – Ragnvald Marensius Gundersen, politician (born 1907)
27 March – Einar Tufte-Johnsen, aviation officer (born 1915).
7 April – Torstein Børte, politician (born 1899)
21 April – Astrid Hjertenæs Andersen, poet and travel writer (born 1915)
23 April – Asbjørn Sunde, sailor, saboteur and spy (born 1909)
24 April – Bernt Ingvaldsen, politician (born 1902)
26 April – Kåre Martin Hansen, politician (born 1913)
28 May – Haakon Hansen, boxer (born 1907)
29 May – Einar Thorsrud, psychologist, researcher and professor (born 1923)
18 June – Axel Strøm, physician (born 1901).
26 June – Torstein Kvamme, politician (born 1893)
9 July – Trygve Braarud, botanist (born 1903)
21 July – Arthur Klæbo, journalist (born 1908).
5 August – Olav Kielland, composer and conductor (born 1901)
12 August – Halvor Bjellaanes, politician (born 1925)
12 August – Kåre Stokkeland, politician (born 1918)
22 August – Peter Torleivson Molaug, politician (born 1902)
26 August – Ole Rømer Aagaard Sandberg, politician (born 1900)
7 September – Finn Seemann, international soccer player (born 1944)
4 October – Trond Halvorsen Wirstad, politician (born 1904)
30 October – Nils Hjelmtveit, politician and Minister (born 1892)
10 November – Olav Sunde, javelin thrower and Olympic bronze medallist (born 1903)
22 November – Gudolf Blakstad, architect (born 1893)
16 December – Jan Bull, author and theatre instructor (born 1927)

Full date unknown
Thorbjørn Feyling, ceramist and designer (born 1907)

See also

References

External links